Marina Vladimirovna Shainova (born 14 March 1986 in Krasnodar Krai) is a Russian weightlifter.

Career 
Shainova won the Junior World Championships twice, 2005 in the 58 kg category, and 2006 in the 63 kg category.

She competed in the women's 58 kg at the 2005 World Championships in Doha, Qatar and won the bronze medal with 233 kg in total.

At the 2006 European Championships in Władysławowo, Poland she won gold in the Women's 58 kg with 237 kg in total, breaking three European records. She won another gold medal at the 2007 European Weightlifting Championships.

At the 2007 World Championships in Chiang Mai, Thailand she won the silver medal in the Women's 58 kg with 237 kg in total.

Shainova won the silver medal at the 2008 Summer Olympics in the 58 kg category. In 2016, she was stripped of her medal and disqualified from the Beijing 2008 Olympics following reanalysis of her samples from the 2008 Olympics, resulted in a positive test for the prohibited substances stanozolol and turinabol.

In 2013, Shainova was banned from international competition by the International Weightlifting Federation for two years for use of the anabolic steroid stanozolol.

References

External links

1986 births
Living people
Russian female weightlifters
Weightlifters at the 2008 Summer Olympics
Olympic weightlifters of Russia
People from Uspensky District
Competitors stripped of Summer Olympics medals
Doping cases in weightlifting
Russian sportspeople in doping cases
European Weightlifting Championships medalists
World Weightlifting Championships medalists
Sportspeople from Krasnodar Krai
21st-century Russian women